State Route 11 (SR 11) is a mostly unsigned south–north highway that goes from the Alabama border in Giles County, Tennessee to the Kentucky border in Montgomery County.

Route description

SR 11 begins as a signed primary highway in Giles County at the Alabama state line. It passes through rolling hills and farmland to pass through Minor Hill and Goodspring before entering the Pulaski city limits at an intersection with US 64. It then becomes concurrent with SR 166 before passing through neighborhoods and crossing a bridge over Richland Creek to enter downtown. They then come to an intersection with SR 15, where SR 11 splits from SR 166 and follows SR 15 east. They then come to an intersection with US 31 (SR 7), where SR 11 becomes unsigned and it follows US 31/SR 7 north to US 31A.

State Route 11 is mostly a primary highway, except for in Pulaski, where it turns secondary between US 64 and US 31. SR 11 is also secondary through the entirety of Rutherford County according to TDOT Functional Classification Map. Finally, SR 11 is secondary throughout Davidson County, from around I-440 to US 41, where it turns primary once again.

Major junctions

See also 
List of state routes in Tennessee

References 

011
U.S. Route 31 
U.S. Route 41
Transportation in Giles County, Tennessee
Transportation in Marshall County, Tennessee
Transportation in Rutherford County, Tennessee
Transportation in Williamson County, Tennessee
Transportation in Davidson County, Tennessee
Transportation in Sumner County, Tennessee
Transportation in Robertson County, Tennessee
Transportation in Montgomery County, Tennessee